Die Blaue Mazur (The Blue Mazurka) is an operetta by Franz Lehár.

It was first performed in Vienna in 1920.

Synopsis
The operetta takes place in Poland and deals with the initially unfortunate marriage of the Viennese Countess Blanka von Lossin with the Polish Count Olinski. Because of her husband's unfaithfulness, his wife leaves him and initially seeks her luck elsewhere. In the end, both spouses realize that they belong together.

References 

Operas by Franz Lehár
1920 operas
German-language operettas